Alonzo Bradley (born October 16, 1953) is a retired American basketball player. Born in Utica, Mississippi, he played collegiately for Texas Southern University.

He was selected by the Indiana Pacers in the second round (29th pick overall) of the 1977 NBA Draft. He played for the Houston Rockets (from 1977 to 1980) in the National Basketball Association (NBA) for 99 games. He was picked by the Dallas Mavericks in the Expansion Draft.

External links

1953 births
Living people
African-American basketball players
Basketball players from Mississippi
Dallas Mavericks expansion draft picks
Houston Rockets players
Indiana Pacers draft picks
Junior college men's basketball players in the United States
People from Utica, Mississippi
Small forwards
Texas Southern Tigers men's basketball players
American men's basketball players
21st-century African-American people
20th-century African-American sportspeople